Bluelight may refer to:

 Billy Bluelight (1859–1949), English boat racer
 Bluelight!, a novel series
 Bluelight (web forum), a web forum dedicated to discussing controlled drugs

See also
 Blue Light (disambiguation)